Donald Thompson is a Canadian retired ice hockey forward who was an All-American for Michigan State.

Career
Thompson briefly played for the Niagara Falls Flyers in 1968–69 but soon left the team so he could register as a freshman at Michigan State University. In doing so, he would be able to count the year as his freshman season and begin to play as a sophomore on the varsity squad in 1970. Shortly after Thompson joined Michigan State, the NCAA changed its long-standing police to limit student athletes to three seasons of varsity play. Beginning with the 1969–70 season, all incoming players had four years of eligibility. As a consequence, when Thompson was named as the WCHA Sophomore of the Year for 1970, he was the final player to receive that award.

Despite the lost season, Thompson became a standout player for the Spartans in the early-1970s. He led the team in scoring in each of his three seasons with the club and was named an All-American in 1971. As a senior, he finished sixth in the nation in scoring. When Thompson graduated he was the Sparta's all-time leading scorer, however, nearly all of his records were surpassed due to the deluge of scoring that occurred in the mid-1970s.

After college, Thompson played senior hockey briefly before becoming a beneficiary of the rapid expansion of professional hockey. Due to both the NHL's and WHA's demand for players, Thompson was able to sign a professional contract with the New Haven Nighthawks. He played parts of two seasons with the team, providing depth scoring and helping them reach the second round in 1974.

Career statistics

Regular season and playoffs

Awards and honors

References

External links

1949 births
Living people
Canadian ice hockey forwards
Ice hockey people from Toronto
Niagara Falls Flyers players
Michigan State Spartans men's ice hockey players
Clinton Comets players
New Haven Nighthawks players
AHCA Division I men's ice hockey All-Americans